AEW Full Gear is a professional wrestling pay-per-view (PPV) event produced by All Elite Wrestling (AEW). Established in 2019, it is held annually around Veterans Day. The name of the event is a reference to a segment from the YouTube series Being The Elite involving AEW wrestler "Hangman" Adam Page. It is considered one of the "Big Four" PPVs for AEW, along with Double or Nothing, All Out, and Revolution, the company's four biggest shows produced quarterly.

History
Shortly after the formation of All Elite Wrestling (AEW) in January 2019, a recurring segment of The Young Bucks' (AEW Executive Vice Presidents Matt Jackson and Nick Jackson) YouTube series Being The Elite began. The segments revolved around AEW wrestler "Hangman" Adam Page, who was always in his full ring gear. The 135th episode of Being The Elite, which was uploaded on January 31, 2019, was in turn titled "Full Gear".

AEW in turn took the title and used it for their November 2019 pay-per-view (PPV) event. The inaugural Full Gear PPV took place on November 9 that year at the Royal Farms Arena in Baltimore, Maryland. The following year, a second Full Gear was held on November 7, thus establishing Full Gear as an annual PPV for AEW held around Veterans Day—this second event was held at AEW's home base of Daily's Place in Jacksonville, Florida due to the COVID-19 pandemic. AEW resumed live touring in July 2021, with the 2021 event held at the Target Center in Minneapolis, Minnesota. The 2022 event was scheduled for the Prudential Center in Newark, New Jersey, marking AEW's first PPV held in the Tri-State area.

AEW President and Chief Executive Officer Tony Khan referred to Full Gear as being one of the promotion's "Big Four" PPVs, their four biggest shows of the year produced quarterly, along with Double or Nothing, All Out, and Revolution.

Events

See also 
List of All Elite Wrestling pay-per-view events

References

External links 
All Elite Wrestling Official website

 
Recurring events established in 2019